is the first album released by Halcali. It reached number five on the Oricon chart in Japan, and stayed on the chart for 21 weeks, making it the first album by a female hip-hop artist to enter the top ten in Japanese history.  Halcali's debut album featured many well-known Japanese hiphop producers as guests, as well. Drowned in Sounds Samual Rosean, in a 2018 article on Shibuya-kei, a micro-genre of Japanese pop combining very different styles, noted that in 2003 it was a "prominent release" (mixing shibuya-kei with "pop rap" and hip-hop), alongside releases by Plus-Tech Squeeze Box and Bo En.

Track listing

CD
 "Intro. Halcali Bacon"
 
 
 
 
 
 "Conversation of a Mystery"
 "Peek-A-Boo"
 "Hello,Hello,Alone"

References

2003 debut albums
Halcali albums